Albuquerque is the largest city in the state of New Mexico, United States.

Albuquerque may also refer to:

People
 Albuquerque (surname)
 Albuquerque Mendes (born 1953), Portuguese artist

Entertainment
 Albuquerque (film), a 1948 Western starring Randolph Scott
 "Albuquerque" (song), the last song on "Weird Al" Yankovic's album Running with Scissors
 "Albuquerque", the eighth song on Neil Young's album Tonight's the Night

Ships
 , a United States Tacoma-class frigate (transferred to Japan in 1953)
 , a United States Los Angeles-class attack submarine

See also
Albuquerque & Takaoka, a Brazilian architecture, civil engineering and real estate development company
Alquerque, a strategy board game, considered the parent of the draughts board games